Saint Rosalia, or Santa Rosalia (1130–1166), is the patron saint of Palermo, Italy.

Santa Rosalía or Santa Rosalia may also refer to:

Places
Santa Rosalía, Vichada, Colombia
Santa Rosalía Airport
Santa Rosalía, Baja California Sur, Mexico

Santa Rosalía, Chihuahua, a place in Matamoros, Mexico
Santa Rosalía, Jalisco

Santa Rosalía, Tamaulipas, a place in Mexican area code 891

Other uses
USS Santa Rosalia (ID-1503), a United States Navy cargo ship in commission 1918–1919